The English Language School (ELS), formerly known as English Medium School, was established in April 1978 in order to carter the growing educational needs of the societies in UAE specially the Muslim and the Asian society.

About
English Language School is home to 1700 students from preschool to grade 13. The students are from Egypt, Philippines, Iran, Italy, Sudan, Nigeria, Saudi Arabia,  Pakistan, India, Afghanistan, Sri Lanka, UAE and many other countries.

ELS is organized into elementary (preschool to grade 5) and secondary (grades 6 to 8 in middle school and grades 9 to 12 in high school). The school offers "Edexcel GCE" and "Edexcel International Alevels (IAL)" courses at A levels and "Edexcel IGCSE" at O levels.

The school has students and teachers both contributing to control the school.  Students are appointed as head girl and boy, vice head girl and boy, head of academics, house captain boys and girls,  and prefects, the students are appointed based on their overall academics result in the years 8, 9 and 10.

References

External links
 

Schools in Dubai